Filip Stuparević (born 30 August 2000) is a Serbian footballer who plays as a forward for Metalac Gornji Milanovac.

Club career

Voždovac

2016–17 season
Born in Belgrade, Stuparević passed Rad's football academy. He moved to Voždovac in summer 2016, penning a three-year professional contract with the club. After he passed the complete pre-season with the first team, playing several friendly matches, Stuparević made his senior debut for Voždovac in the first fixture of the 2016–17 Serbian SuperLiga season on 23 July 2016, at the age of 15. Replacing Slaviša Radović in the 88th minute of a match against Spartak Subotica, Filip became the youngest player in the Serbian SuperLiga history. After his appearance confirmed as irregular by the rules, Voždovac lost the match with official result. During the season, Stuparević received 9 caps in the domestic league, all as a back-up player, and also appeared for the youth team.

2017–18 season
Stuparević started the 2017–18 season as a back-up choice for Dejan Georgijević. He started his first senior match on the field against Borac Čačak in 3 fixture, played on 5 August 2017. Several days later, Stuparević scored the first goal in his professional career in 3–1 away victory against Partizan, after which he was elected for a player of the week in the Serbian SuperLiga.

International career
Stuparević was a part of the first Serbia under-15 national team squad, formed ending of 2014. Later he was also called into the Serbian under-16 national football team. Playing for the team, Stuparević scored in matches against Moldova, Ukraine, Latvia and Croatia. In summer 2017, Stuparević had been invited to the Serbian under-17 national team squad by Ilija Stolica. On 22 March 2017, Stuparević scored for 1–0 victory over Montenegro, after which Serbia qualified for the 2017 UEFA European Under-17 Championship. Playing at the tournament under coach Perica Ognjenović, Stuparević scored from the penalty kick in a match against Germany.

Career statistics

References

External links
 
 
 
 

2000 births
Living people
Footballers from Belgrade
Association football forwards
Serbian footballers
Serbian expatriate footballers
Serbia youth international footballers
Serbia under-21 international footballers
FK Voždovac players
1. FK Příbram players
FK Metalac Gornji Milanovac players
Serbian SuperLiga players
Czech First League players
Serbian expatriate sportspeople in the Czech Republic
Expatriate footballers in the Czech Republic